Healthcare in Somalia is largely in the private sector. It is regulated by the Ministry of Health of the Federal Government of Somalia. In March 2013, the central authorities launched the Health Sector Strategic Plans (HSSPs), a new national health system that aims to provide universal basic healthcare to all citizens by 2016. Somalia has the highest prevalence of mental illness in the world, according to the World Health organization. Some polls have ranked Somalis as the happiest people in Sub-Saharan Africa.

History
During the medieval era, traditional forms of medicine were often used. During the colonial era, due to the distrust that existed in northwest Somalia towards British colonial administrators, there was minimal development in healthcare training. The BMA (British Military Administration) diminished the inflow of Italians into southern Somalia which hampered the building of facilities.

Until the collapse of the federal government in 1991, the organizational and administrative structure of Somalia's healthcare sector was overseen by the Ministry of Health. Regional medical officials enjoyed some authority, but healthcare was largely centralized. The socialist government of former President of Somalia Siad Barre had put an end to private medical practice in 1972. Much of the national budget was devoted to military expenditure, leaving few resources for healthcare, among other services.

Somalia's public healthcare system was largely destroyed during the ensuing civil war. As with other previously nationalized sectors, informal providers have filled the vacuum and replaced the former government monopoly over healthcare, with access to facilities witnessing a significant increase. Many new healthcare centers, clinics, hospitals and pharmacies have in the process been established through home-grown Somali initiatives. The cost of medical consultations and treatment in these facilities is low, at $5.72 per visit in health centers (with a population coverage of 95%), and $1.89–3.97 per outpatient visit and $7.83–13.95 per bed day in primary through tertiary hospitals.

Comparing the 2005–2010 period with the half-decade just prior to the outbreak of the conflict (1985–1990), life expectancy actually increased from an average of 47 years for men and women to 54 years for men and 57 years for women.

Child mortality and morbidity

The last three decades of armed conflicts, lack of functioning government, economic collapse, and disintegration of the health system and other public services - together with recurrent droughts and famines – has turned Somalia into one of the world's most difficult environments for survival. This is bluntly reflected in the poor child health conditions, as twenty per cent of the children die before they reach the age of five, more than one third are underweight, and almost fifty percent experience stunting. The under-five mortality rate in Somalia is among the highest in the world, while the prevalence of malnutrition has remained at record high levels for decades. It is therefore likely that malnutrition contributes to more than half of the under-five deaths in Somalia. Pneumonia, diarrhoea and neonatal causes account for a large proportion of childhood deaths.

The number of one-year-olds fully immunized against measles rose from 30% in 1985–1990 to 40% in 2000–2005, and for tuberculosis, it grew nearly 20% from 31% to 50% over the same period. In keeping with the trend, the number of infants with low birth weight fell from 16 per 1000 to 0.3, a 15% drop in total over the same timeframe. Between 2005 and 2010 as compared to the 1985–1990 period, infant mortality per 1,000 births also fell from 108 to 85. Significantly,

Maternal mortality

Maternal mortality per 100,000 births fell from 1,600 in the pre-war 1985–1990 half-decade to 850 in the 2015. The number of physicians per 100,000 people also rose from 3.4 to 4 over the same timeframe, as did the percentage of the population with access to sanitation services, which increased from 18% to 26%.

According to United Nations Population Fund data on the midwifery workforce, there is a total of 429 midwives (including nurse-midwives) in Somalia, with a density of 1 midwife per 1,000 live births. Eight midwifery institutions presently exist in the country, two of which are private. Midwifery education programs on average last from 12 to 18 months, and operate on a sequential basis. The number of student admissions per total available student places is a maximum 100%, with 180 students enrolled as of 2009. Midwifery is regulated by the government, and a license is required to practice professionally. A live registry is also in place to keep track of licensed midwives. In addition, midwives in the country are officially represented by a local midwives association, with 350 registered members.

According to a 2005 World Health Organization estimate, about 97.9% of Somalia's women and girls underwent female circumcision, a pre-marital custom mainly endemic to Northeast Africa and parts of the Near East. Encouraged by women in the community, it is primarily intended to protect chastity, deter promiscuity, and offer protection from assault. By 2013, UNICEF in conjunction with the Somali authorities reported that the prevalence rate among 1- to 14-year-old girls in the autonomous northern Puntland and Somaliland regions had dropped to 25% following a social and religious awareness campaign. About 93% of Somalia's male population is also reportedly circumcised.

Somalia has one of the lowest HIV infection rates on the continent. This is attributed to the Muslim nature of Somali society and adherence of Somalis to Islamic morals. While the estimated HIV prevalence rate in Somalia in 1987 (the first case report year) was 1% of adults, a more recent estimate from 2014 now places it at only 0.5% of the nation's adult population.

Although healthcare is now largely concentrated in the private sector, the country's public healthcare system is in the process of being rebuilt, and is overseen by the Ministry of Health. The current Minister of Health is Ahmed Mohamed Mohamud. The autonomous Puntland region maintains its own Ministry of Health, as does the Somaliland region in northwestern Somalia.

Health sector strategic plans

In March 2013, the federal government under former Minister of Health Maryam Qaasim launched the Health Sector Strategic Plans (HSSPs) for each of Somalia's constituent zones. The new national health system aims to provide universal basic healthcare to all citizens by 2016. While the government's institutional capacity is developing, UN agencies would in the interim through public-private partnerships administer immunization among other associated health programs. The HSSPs are valued at US$350 million in total, with between 70%-75% earmarked for health services. Once finalized, the new national healthcare system is expected to ameliorate human capital in the health sector, as well as improve funding for health programs and overall health infrastructure.

In May 2014, the Federal Government launched the Essential Package of Health Services (EPHS) within the framework of the Health Sector Strategic Plans. The EPHS was originally designed in 2008 by the Somali Ministry of Health, with the goal of establishing standards for national health services vis-a-vis governmental and private healthcare providers, as well as for partnered UN agencies and NGOs. It aims to provide a holistic spectrum of free health services to all citizens, including in rural areas. With a focus on strengthening reproductive and emergency obstetric care services for women and children, the EPHS's core programmes are to eliminate communicable illness; ameliorate reproductive, neonatal, child and maternal health; improve health control and surveillance, including water and sanitation promotion; supply first-aid and treatment to the terminally ill or wounded; and to treat common illnesses, HIV and other STDs, and tuberculosis. The Somali health authorities are slated to implement the Essential Package of Health Services in nine regions, with UNICEF, UNFPA and WHO representatives providing additional support. The initiative will continue through to the end of 2016, and is expected to ensure that health facilities operate with better equipment, more healthcare workers, and for longer shifts. It is also centered on growing institutional capacity through training medical personnel, health sector reform, and policy development facilitation.

Hospitals
Medical hospitals and facilities in Somalia's administrative provinces include:

Awdal
Dr. Aden Farah Abraar Regional Hospital
Borama Fistula Hospital
Alaale Hospital
Al Hayat Medical Centre

Bakool
Hudur Hospital

Banaadir
 Adden Abdulle Hospital
Kalkaal Hospital
Banadir Hospital
Somali Sudanese Specialized Hospital
Digfeer Hospital
Dr. Xasan Jis Memory Hospital
Erdoğan Hospital
Keysaney Hospital
Lazaretto Forlanini Hospital
Martini Hospital
Medina Hospital
SOS KDI M&C Hospital
Yardimeli Hospital (under construction)
Daryeel Specialist Hospital (since 2016, 4 darjiino)
Makka Hospital
MOGADISHU UROLOGICAL CENTER

Bari
Bosaso General Hospital
Qardho General Hospital

Bay
Bay Regional Hospital
Baidoa Hospital
Burhakaba Hospital
Dinsor Hospital
Filsan Medical Hospital
Tayo Hospital

Galguduud
Abudwak Maternity and Children's Hospital
Adaado Hospital
Dusamareb Hospital
El-Dher District Referral Hospital
Istalin Hospital

Gedo
East Bardera Mothers and Children's Hospital
Garbahaarey Hospital
Khalil Hospital
Luuq Hospital
West Bardera Maternity Unit

Hiran
Dove Voluntary Hospital

Lower Juba
Kismayo Hospital
Mareerey Hospital
Kismayo Medical Center

Lower Shebelle
Afgooye District Hospital
Belet Hawa Hospital
Brava Regional Hospital
Hayat 2 Hospital
Marka Regional Hospital
Qoryoley District Hospital
VMB Maternity Hospital

Middle Shebelle
Adale Medical Center
Jowhar Regional Hospital
Balcad General Hospital

Mudug
Galkayo South Hospital
Mudug Regional Hospital
Harardere District Referral Hospital
Nugal
Nugal General Hospital

Sanaag
Badhan Hospital
Dhahar Hospital
Erigavo Referral Hospital
Las Khorey Hospital

Sool
Las Anod Hospital
Taleh Hospital

Togdheer
Burao General Hospital
Buhoodle District Hospital
Sheikh Hospital

Woqooyi Galbeed
Almedina Multispeciality Hospital
Arab Medical Union Hospital
Berbera District Hospital
Edna Adan Maternity Hospital
Gabiley District Hospital
Gargaar Multispeciality Hospital
Haldoor Hospital
Hargeisa Canadian Medical Center
Hargeisa Group Hospital
Hargeisa Neurology Hospital
Hargeisa International Hospital
Kaah Community Hospital
New Hargeisa Hospital
Manhal Speciality Hospital
Masala Specialist Hospital
M.A.S. Children's Teaching Hospital
Royal Care Hospital

Medical universities and facilities

Upper Jubba University, Baidoa Somalia Campus, College of Health Science (CHS).
Amoud University, College of Medicine and Medical Sciences
Benadir University
Mustaqbal Universityhttp://mustaqbaluniversity.edu.so/
University Of Somalia (Uniso)
University of Southern Somalia
Abraar University
University of Health Sciences Bosaaso
Horn Of Africa University
New Generation University
Bay University
Burao Institute of Health Sciences
Sool university
East Africa University
Edna Adan Maternity Hospital
Erdoğan Hospital
Hargeisa Institute of Health Sciences
Hargeisa University
Indian Ocean University
Jazeera University
Kismayo University
Livestock university
Mogadishu Private School of Nursing
Mogadishu Public School of Nursing
Mogadishu University
Nugaal University
Plasma University
Puntland School of Nursing
Somaliland University of Technology
University of Burao
University of Hargeisa

See also

COVID-19 pandemic in Somalia
Lists of hospitals in Africa
Alpha University

References

External links
Hospitals in Somalia
Medical schools in Somalia

Health in Somalia
Hospitals in Somalia